The knockout stage of UEFA Euro 2000 started with the first quarter-final on 24 June and ended with the final on 2 July 2000.

All times Central European Summer Time (UTC+2)

Format
Any game in the knockout stage that was undecided by the end of the regular 90 minutes, was followed by up to 30 minutes of extra time (two 15-minute halves). In extra time, the golden goal rule was applied, whereby the match would immediately end upon either team scoring, with the team having scored being declared the winner. If scores were still level after 30 minutes of extra time, there would be a penalty shoot-out to determine who progressed to the next round. As with every tournament since UEFA Euro 1984, there was no third place play-off.

Qualified teams
The top two placed teams from each of the four groups qualified for the knockout stage.

Bracket

Quarter-finals
In the first quarter-final, Portugal defeated Turkey thanks to a brace from striker Nuno Gomes. Italy beat Romania by the same scoreline, with Francesco Totti and Filippo Inzaghi scoring a goal apiece.

The Netherlands thrashed FR Yugoslavia 6–1 in the third match, Patrick Kluivert (3) and Marc Overmars (2) amongst the scorers. In the final game, Spain's European dream came to an end with a 2–1 loss to France: Gaizka Mendieta's penalty goal was sandwiched by goals from Zinedine Zidane and Youri Djorkaeff. Raúl failed to convert a last-minute penalty kick that would have sent the match to extra time.

Turkey vs Portugal

Italy vs Romania

Netherlands vs FR Yugoslavia

Spain vs France

Semi-finals
France and Italy both emerged victorious from their semi-finals against difficult opposition to reach the final. France beat Portugal 2–1 after extra-time; Nuno Gomes gave Portugal the lead in the 19th minute, which they held until just after half-time, when Thierry Henry equalised. The game went to extra-time and looked to be heading for a penalty shootout until Zidane struck the golden goal in the 117th minute.

Italy drew 0–0 in normal time with the Netherlands and it remained the same through extra-time. The game went to penalties and Italy won the penalty shoot-out 3–1. The Netherlands had a particularly dismal showing from the penalty spot this game, with Frank de Boer having a penalty saved and Kluivert hitting the post during normal time, in addition to the failure of the Dutch to convert three out of their four penalties taken during the shoot-out. Perhaps most infamous was Jaap Stam's attempt during the shoot-out (which ballooned well over the crossbar), described by the BBC as "one of the worst spot kicks ever".

France vs Portugal

Italy vs Netherlands

Final

Notes

References

External links

 UEFA Euro 2000 official history

2000
Knockout Stage
knock
knock
knock
Turkey at UEFA Euro 2000
Portugal at UEFA Euro 2000
knock
Romania at UEFA Euro 2000
FR Yugoslavia at UEFA Euro 2000